The Badminton Asia is the governing body of badminton in Asia. It is one of the 5 continental bodies under the flag of the Badminton World Federation (BWF). The confederation was established in 1959, headquartered in Malé, Maldives. It aims to maintain Asia as the benchmark for world badminton in many years to come. It now has 43 member federations. It had decided in the Annual General Meeting on July 16, 2006 that the confederation name was changed from Asian Badminton Confederation (ABC) to Badminton Asia Confederation (BAC).

During Badminton Asia Extraordinary General Meeting on 16 October 2015 in Kuwait, the organization rebranded itself by unveiling the new logo for the confederation renaming the organization as Badminton Asia.

Member associations
Zones:

West (11)
 Bahrain
 Iran
 Iraq
 Jordan
 Kuwait
 Lebanon
 Palestine
 Qatar
 Saudi Arabia
 Syria
 United Arab Emirates

Central (5)
 Kazakhstan
 Kyrgyzstan
 Tajikistan
 Turkmenistan
 Uzbekistan

South (8)
 Afghanistan
 Bangladesh
 Bhutan
 India
 Maldives
 Nepal
 Pakistan
 Sri Lanka

East (8)
 China
 Hong Kong
 Japan
 Macau
 Mongolia
 North Korea
 South Korea
 Chinese Taipei

Southeast (11)
 Brunei
 Cambodia
 Indonesia
 Laos
 Malaysia
 Myanmar
 Philippines
 Singapore
 Thailand
 Timor Leste
 Vietnam

Associate members 

  Oman
  Yemen

Tournaments
Badminton Asia Championships from 1962.
Badminton Asia Team Championships from 2016.
Badminton Asia Mixed Team Championships from 2017.
Badminton Asia Junior Championships (U19) from 1997.
Badminton Asia Junior Championships (U17) and (U15) from 2006.
Badminton Asia Para Championships from 2008.
Badminton Asia Senior Championships from 2020.

References

External links
Official website
Badminton Asia Confederation - Tag Archive - Sports247.My

Badminton organizations
Sports governing bodies in Asia
Badminton World Federation
Badminton in Asia
1959 establishments in Asia